Vojnik is the largest settlement and the centre of the Municipality of Vojnik in eastern Slovenia. It lies on the Hudinja River, north of Celje. The area is part of the traditional region of Lower Styria. The municipality is now included in the Savinja Statistical Region.

Locals make their living from farming, but there are also many small businesses. Vojnik was first mentioned as a borough in 1306. There were many fires in the town, and the town even burned to the ground in 1839.

Name
Vojnik was first attested in written sources in 1165 as de Hoheneke (and as Hohnec in 1173, Hohenekke circa 1175, and Hohenek in 1199).  The medieval German forms of the name (literally, 'high hill') are the result of folk etymology. The name is derived from *Xvojьnikъ, from Slavic *xvoja 'fir, spruce'. Accentual evidence makes the name's derivation from *vojьnikъ 'soldier' unlikely. In the past, the standard German name of the town was Hochenegg.

Churches
The parish church in the settlement is dedicated to Saint Bartholomew and belongs to the Roman Catholic Diocese of Celje. It is a Neo-Romanesque building dating to 1899. A second church in the settlement is dedicated to Saint Florian. It dates to the mid-15th century and has a Gothic sanctuary with a 17th-century nave.

Mass graves

Vojnik is the site of three known mass graves from the period immediately after the Second World War. The Višnja Vas 1 Mass Grave, also known as the Hmezad Mass Grave, is located north of the settlement, north of the building at Vojnik no. 2, at a new construction site that was the location of a former wooden shed for the Hmezad company. The grave contains the remains of about 100 Croatian soldiers and civilians that were murdered in May 1945 while fleeing towards Dobrna. It contains the remains of Croatian civilians that were murdered in May 1945 while fleeing towards Dobrna. The Vojnik Mass Grave lies west of the settlement, in the parking lot in front of the cemetery and below the funeral chapel. It contains the remains of 100 to 200 Croatian civilians and soldiers that were murdered in May 1945.

Notable people
Notable people that were born or lived in Vojnik include:
 (1853–1923), pedagogue, journalist, and political activist
Doroteja Hauser (1877–1946), painter
Karel Henn (1809–1877), founder of a Slovenian spa and promoter of the still mineral water pump
Anton Novačan (1887–1951), author, politician, and diplomat
Anton Martin Slomšek (1800–1862), Roman Catholic bishop and orator

References

External links

 
 Vojnik on Geopedia

Populated places in the Municipality of Vojnik